Triplophysa laterimaculata is a species of stone loach endemic to the Tarim Basin, Xinjiang.

References

laterimaculata
Freshwater fish of China
Endemic fauna of China
Fish described in 2007